The 2018 Charlotte 49ers football team represented the University of North Carolina at Charlotte in the 2018 NCAA Division I FBS football season. The 49ers played their home games at Jerry Richardson Stadium in Charlotte, NC, and competed in the East Division of Conference USA (C–USA). They were led by sixth-year head coach Brad Lambert. They finished the season 5–7, 4–4 in C-USA play to finish in fourth place in the East Division.

On November 18, head coach Brad Lambert was fired. He was allowed to stay on to coach their final game of the season. Lambert, who was the first and only coach Charlotte had in their history to that point, finished with a six-year record of 22–48.

On December 5, Charlotte hired Austin Peay head coach Will Healy for the job.

Previous season
The 49ers finished the 2017 season 1–11, 1–7 in C-USA play to finish in last place in the East Division.

Coaching staff

Following the disappointing one win season, there was speculation that Brad Lambert would be released. Charlotte Chancellor Phillip Dubois and athletics director Judy Rose issued a statement just days after the final game informing the community that Lambert would be retained for the following season. Lambert shook up his staff, firing defensive coordinator Matt Wallerstedt, quarterbacks coach and former offensive coordinator Jeff Mullen and receivers coach Damien Gary. Greg Adkins had replaced Mullen as offensive coordinator mid-season but went back to only having responsibility for the offensive line and running backs and would soon resign to join the staff at conference rival Marshall. Before the end of the year Youngstown State offensive coordinator and former Miami of Ohio head coach Shawn Montgomery would be called in to serve as the 49ers' play caller on offense. In February, former Oklahoma State defensive coordinator Glenn Spencer took the same position on the 49ers' staff. Charlie Shalaski took over responsibility for receivers at the same time. A week later Howard co-defensive coordinator Chip West would join the staff to serve as co-defensive coordinator with Spencer, with Spencer being responsible for linebackers and West being in charge of Cornerbacks. Graduate assistant Brad Queen would move up to the coaching staff to coach defensive tackles. Former Tulane head coach Chris Scelfo joined the staff before the Spring Game to serve as the 49ers offensive line coach and run game coordinator. James Adams's promotion to assistant head coach before the Spring Game rounded out the staff changes for the upcoming 2018 season.

Recruiting

Position key

Recruiting class

The following recruits and transfers have signed letters of intent or verbally committed to the Charlotte 49ers football program for the 2018 recruiting year.

Players

Roster

Awards and honors

Preseason

In-Season

Post-season

Player gameday honors

Depth chart

Schedule

Television

Charlotte 49ers home games and conference road games will be broadcast through Conference USA's television partners ESPN, CBS Sports, Stadium, beIN, and Facebook Watch. Additional games will be available locally in the Charlotte TV market on WCCB.

Radio

Radio coverage for all games is broadcast by IMG College through the Charlotte 49ers Radio Network flagship station WZGV ESPN Radio 730 AM The Game, and the TuneIn Charlotte 49ers IMG Sports Network app. The radio announcers are "Voice of the 49ers" Matt Swierad with play-by-play, former Carolina Panther Kevin Donnalley with color commentary, and Bobby Rosinski with sideline reports. Swierad and Donnalley also host the "Gold Mine Live" Coaches Show each Monday during the season at noon from Norm's in the UNC Charlotte Student Union. "Gold Mine Live" can be heard on Mondays.

Preseason media poll
Conference USA released their preseason media poll on July 17, 2018, with the 49ers predicted to finish in last place in the East Division.

Game summaries

Fordham Rams

Sources:

Lightning delayed the start of the game for over an hour and both teams started off slowly after the delay. Charlotte took a one score lead into the halftime period, which saw another lightning delay force a temporary evacuation of the stadium. Fordham would get the score down to a field goal difference, but the Charlotte offense would finally pull away late with three consecutive touchdowns to end the game nearly five and a half hours after its scheduled start time.

Top performances for the game were narrowly dominated by the 49ers. Quarterback Chris Reynolds threw for 267 yards and a touchdown. Rusher Benny LeMay had 25 carries for 135 yards and two touchdowns. Victor Tucker had 7 receptions for 127 yards and a touchdown.

Game notes:

First Lightning delayed game in program history.
First time Jerry Richardson Stadium had to be evacuated.

Appalachian State Mountaineers

Sources:

These two in-state schools met for the first time on the gridiron in this clash that saw high local interest. App, coming off a near upset win at ranked Penn State the previous weekend wanted to make a statement. They kept the Niners out of the endzone for the entire game. All nine of the Niners points came in the second quarter and from greater than 46 yards away off the foot of Jonathan Cruz. The game was still in reach at halftime, but three second half touchdowns sealed the victory for the Mountaineers.

Top performers for the game include App State quarterback Zach Thomas, who passed for 295 yards and two touchdowns. Both teams defenses were stingy on the ground. App's Jalin Moore and Charlotte's Benny LeMay had similar rushing states with Moore having 11 carries for 38 yards, and LeMay getting 35 yards on 7 carries. App's Corey Xavier Sutton had 3 receptions for 155 yards and two touchdowns.

Game notes:

 For the first time, temporary bleachers were brought in to meet high game ticket demand.
 A new Jerry Richardson Stadium attendance record was set at 19,151.
 First meeting between these in-state schools.
 Kicker Jonathan Cruz was named the Conference USA Special Teams Player of the week.

Old Dominion Monarchs

Sources:

Due to the expected effects of Hurricane Florence along the eastern seaboard this game, originally scheduled for Saturday, September 15, was move up two days earlier to Thursday, September 13. Both teams would trade scores throughout the game but Charlotte would finish with the most to secure the conference opener victory and end the three-game season=opening home stand at two wins, one loss.

Top performers for the game were Charlotte quarterback Chris Reynolds who threw for 202 yards and two touchdowns. Old Dominions' Lala Davis rushed for 63 yards on 25 carriers earning two touchdowns. The Monarch' Jonathan Duhart had 7 receptions for 127 yards and a touchdown.

Game notes:

First weather advanced game in program history.
First win for the 49ers against their C-USA East Division rival Monarchs.

Massachusetts Minutemen

Sources:

Charlotte's first visit to the State of Massachusetts didn't go quite as they had planned. Giving up a  devastating three touchdowns in the first three and a half minutes of the game, including an opening kickoff 93-yard return, a fumble recovery which one play later added another touchdown for the Minutemen, and a blocked punt that three plays later added the third UMass touchdown, would prove insurmountable for the Niners to overcome. Though the Niners would eventually find their offense and trade scores with the Minutement for the final three quarters of the game, the four first quarter touchdowns the Niners gave up proved to be the difference in the final score.

Top performers for the game included Charlotte quarterback Chris Reynolds, who passed for 283 yards and three touchdowns. UMass rusher Marquis Young had 12 carries for 77 yards and two touchdowns. The Minutemen's' Andy Isabella had 6 receptions for 85 yards and a touchdown.

Game notes:

First game for the program in the State of Massachusetts.

UAB Blazers

Sources:

Though a mostly defensive struggle, the eventual C-USA Champions never let the Niners get into their offensive groove, denying them a scoring chance until the fourth quarter. UAB would get the home win to avenge their previous season loss to the Niners, which had been the Niners' only win the previous season.

UAB quarterback A.J. Erdely passed for 214 yards and a touchdown. The Blazers' Spencer Brown had 18 carries for 68 yards and two touchdowns. Blazers' receiver Andre Wilson made the most of his two catches with 67 yards and a touchdown.

Game notes:

First game in the State of Alabama in team history.

WKU Hilltoppers

Sources:

The struggling Hilltoppers rolled into Charlotte for the first time to take on the 49ers at home. The game was low scoring and close at halftime, but Charlotte soon found their offensive stride in the third quarter to put the game well out of reach.

Top performers for the game included Charlotte quarterback Chris Reynolds, who threw for 119 yards before a season-ending leg injury took him out of the game. Charlotte's Benny LeMay had 17 carries for 1231 yards and two touchdowns. Charlotte's Victor Tucker had 9 receptions for 91 yards.

Game notes:

Linebacker Juwan Foggie was named the Conference USA Defensive Player of the Week.
Hilltoppers first visit to Jerry Richardson Stadium.

Middle Tennessee Blue Raiders

Sources:

Charlotte would score first and take that lead into the second quarter, but by halftime the Blue Raiders would add two touchdowns of their own. Neither team found points in the third quarter but a costly Charlotte fumble on their own goal line would let the Blue Raider defense score. Charlotte would tack on another touchdown near the end of regulation but it wouldn't be enough to get a win as Charlotte's road woes continued.

Top performers included Middle Tennessee quarterback Brent Stockstill who passed for 111 yards, all three of the Blue Raiders' touchdowns, and an interception. Charlotte's Benny LeMay had 19 carries for 129 yards and a touchdown. Middle Tennessee's Ty Lee had 6 receptions for 60 yards and two touchdowns.

Game notes:

Southern Miss Golden Eagles

Sources:

Charlotte would take an early two touchdown lead in the first quarter, helped by a timely Juwan Foggie interception return on what looked otherwise like a scoring drive for the Golden Eagles. Charlotte held Southern Miss scoreless at the half. Both teams would tack on field goals in the third quarter before Southern Miss finally found the endzone in the fourth quarter. The Golden Eagles would add another touchdown late in the game but a 53-yard fourth quarter field goal from Jonathan Cruz proved to be the difference maker for the Niner's to get the home win.

Top performers for the game included Southern Miss quarterback Jack Abraham, who despite throwing 3 interceptions managed to gain 210 yards for the Golden Eagle through the air. Charlotte's Benny LeMay continued his march to a 1000-yard season with 19 carries for 62 yards. The Golden Eagles' Tim Jones had 5 receptions for 96 yards.

Game notes:

Kicker Jonathan Cruz was again named Conference USA Special Teams Player of the Week.

Tennessee Volunteers

Sources:

Early on it looked like the game would get out of hand as the Volunteers gained a two touchdown lead in the first quarter, but Charlotte's 6th place nationally ranked run defense would hold the traditional SEC power to negative running yardage well into the fourth quarter. Tennessee would finish the game with only 20 yards on the ground, but the Tennessee defense was able to keep the Niners from finding the endzone.

Top performers of the game included Tennessee quarterback Jarrett Guarantano, who threw for 172 yards and a touchdown. Charlotte's Benny LeMay had 24 carries for 81 yards, single-handedly quadrupling the total team rushing yardage of the Volunteers. Tennessee's Josh Palmer had 5 receptions for 71 yards and a touchdown.

Game notes:

First meeting between these two programs.
Punter Kyle Corbett would kick a school-record 75-yarder.
Defensive end Alex Highsmith was named Conference USA Defensive Player of the Week.

Marshall Thundering Herd

Sources:

The game would stay a tight scoring affair with the Niner's evening the game up early in the third quarter, But Marshall would add two touchdowns and a field goal before the end of the quarter to earn the home victory and keeping the Niners winless on the road for the season.

Top performances for the game were Marshall quarterback Isaiah Green, with 178 passing yards and a touchdown. The Herd's Brendan Knox had 22 carries for 116 yards and a touchdown. Thundering Herd receiver Tyre Brady had 6 receptions for 95 yards.

Game notes:

FIU Panthers

Sources:

With the Panthers still in the hunt for the East Division crown and a chance to make the Conference USA Championship Game on the line, the 49ers faced a tall order on Senior Day. The two teams would trade leads with the Panthers heading in at the half with a one score lead. Despite a dominating ground performance from Charlotte rusher Benny LeMay, the Niners wouldn't find the lead again, but always managed to keep it within one score. A final on-sides recovery attempt failed and the Niners lost their second and last home game of the season.

Top performers for the game included Panthers' quarterback James Morgan, who threw for 268 yards and 2 touchdowns. Charlotte's Benny LeMay would rack up four touchdowns and 159 yards on 30 carries. Charlotte's Victor Tucker had 4 receptions for 115 yards.

Game notes:

Benny LeMay would tie the single-game scoring record held by receiver Austin Duke of four touchdowns.
LeMay would become the second 49er with a 1000-yard season, joining Kalif Phillips.
LeMay also broke the 49ers' single-season rushing record as members of FBS. 
Head Coach Brad Lambert was released following the game and the Niner's elimination from bowl eligibility. He would coach the Niners in the final game of the season on the road at FAU.

Florida Atlantic Owls

Sources:

The defending Conference USA Champions were looking to extend their season by becoming bowl eligible off of a fifth straight win. The Niners were looking for their first road win and to send their seniors and their head coach out as victors. It looked like the Owls would have the upper hand early when they scored on the very first play from scrimmage, however the Niners would have the lead heading into the second quarter. The Owls had their biggest lead of the game heading into halftime, but in the second half Charlotte would battle back to retake the lead early in the fourth quarter. The Owls would tie the game up with a little more than three minutes left on the clock, but Charlotte kicker and two time Conference USA Special Teams Player of the Week Jonathan Cruz would hit a decisive 56 yard field goal with under half a minute left on the clock to give the Niners their only road win of the season.

Top performers of the game included Florida Atlantic passer Chris Robinson who threw for 273 yards and 2 touchdowns. Charlotte's Benny LeMay capped a stellar season with 24 carries for 173 yards and a touchdown. The Owls' Kerrith Whyte Jr. had 3 receptions for 92 yards and a touchdown.

Game notes:

The win gave Lambert his final victory as Charlotte 49ers head coach with an overall record of 22–48 in his six seasons (9–31 against FBS opponents).
Jonathan Cruz's two 50+ yard field goals, including the game-winner, earned him an unprecedented third Conference USA Special Teams Player of the Week honor.
Defensive end Alex Highsmith tied Larry Ogunjobi's single-game tackles for loss mark at 4.5 TFL's.
Highsmith broke Ogunjobi's single-season TFL record with 17.5 TFL's.
Highsmith was named to the Pro Football Focus National Defensive Team of the Week and the College Sports Madness Conference USA Defensive Player of the Week.
Benny LeMay finished the season with 2135 all-purpose yards (1128 rushing, 1007 receiving).

Attendance

Players drafted into the NFL

References

Charlotte
Charlotte 49ers football seasons
Charlotte 49ers football